Action books is an independent press housed at the English Department at University of Notre Dame. The editors are Johannes Göransson and Joyelle McSweeney. The press publishes form-breaking and hybrid work with a focus on texts in translation.

Action Books has had three books on the poetry shortlist for the Best Translated Book Award: Jeffrey Angles' translation of Killing Kanoko by Hiromi Ito (2010), 'Molly Weigel's translation of In the Moremarrow by Oliverio Girondo (2014), and Cheer Up, Femme Fatale by Yideum Kim translated by Ji Yoon Lee, Don Mee Choi, and Johannes Göransson (2017). Sorrowtoothpaste Mirrorcream by Kim Hyesoon, translated by Don Mee Choi, was a finalist for the 2015 PEN Award for Poetry in Translation.

References 

Small press publishing companies
Independent News & Media